Laurent Mangel (born 22 May 1981 in Vesoul, Haute-Saône) is a French former professional racing cyclist, who rode professionally between 2005 and 2014 for the ,  and  teams.

Major results

2004
 1st Overall Tour Nord Isère
1st Points classification
1st Stage 2
 1st Overall Ruban Granitier Breton
1st Stages 1 & 5
 2nd Paris–Troyes
2005
 1st Stage 2 Boucles de la Mayenne
2006
 1st Stage 6 Tour de Langkawi
 6th Overall Circuit Franco-Belge
 9th Le Samyn
2009
 1st Stage 3 Tour de Bretagne
 1st Stage 2 Tour du Gévaudan Languedoc-Roussillon
2010
 1st Classic Loire Atlantique
 1st Stage 1 Boucles de la Mayenne
 3rd Overall Tour de Wallonie
1st Stage 4
 3rd Paris–Camembert
 5th Tour du Doubs
2011
 4th Boucles du Sud Ardèche
 6th Overall Circuit de Lorraine
 7th Eschborn-Frankfurt City Loop
 8th Classic Loire Atlantique
2012
 2nd Cholet-Pays de Loire
 3rd Grand Prix de la Ville de Lillers
2013
 4th Grand Prix de la Somme

References

External links

1981 births
Living people
Sportspeople from Vesoul
French male cyclists
Cyclists from Bourgogne-Franche-Comté